The Union Cycliste Internationale (UCI), the world's governing body in the sport of bicycle racing, classifies races according to a rating scale.

The rating is represented by a code made of two or three parts and indicates both the type or style of race (the first part), and its importance or difficulty (the second and third parts, lower being harder). The first part can be an integer or an abbreviation, and the second part, when present, are usually integers. Both parts are separated by a period or decimal point (.).

A higher rated race will result in the successful riders receiving more world ranking points.

Road racing 
UCI race classifications are denoted as follows:

The first part of the code denotes whether the race is one-day '1', or a multi-day (stage) race '2'. The second part of the code indicates the race ranking. From highest to lowest these are;

'.UWT' (UCI World Tour) or '.WWT' (Women’s World Tour),

'.Pro',

'.1',

'.2'.

For example, a race rated 1.1 equates to a one-day, category 1 race. A race classification ‘U’ (e.g. 2.2U) denotes an U-23 race and ‘NCup’ (e.g. 1.NCup) a Nations Cup race involving national teams or ‘mixed teams’.

Mountain biking 
The mountain bike discipline includes the following events comprising the formats listed below:

Cyclo-cross 
All cyclo-cross races are identified by the code 'C'. Again, no decimal point is used in the written form of the classifications.

Code tables

References

External links
 UCI codes explained - cyclingnews.com - Jeff Jones and John Stevenson

Union Cycliste Internationale
Classification systems by subject